Robert Riley may refer to:

 Bob Riley (born 1944), governor of Alabama from 2003 to 2011.
 Bob Riley (race car designer), sports car designer and founder of Riley Technologies
 Bob C. Riley (1924–1994), acting Governor of Arkansas for 11 days in 1975
 Bob Riley (American football), American football player and coach
 Bob Riley (basketball) (born 1948), American basketball player
 Robert Christopher Riley (born 1980), American actor
 Rob Riley (Aboriginal activist) (1954–1996),  Aboriginal activist advancing Indigenous issues in Australia
 Rob Riley (comic strip), British comic strip of the 1960s and 1970s
 Rob Riley (ice hockey) (born 1955), American ice hockey coach
 Robert Riley (diplomat), U.S. ambassador to Micronesia
 Robert Riley (mathematician) (died 2000), American mathematician

See also
Robert Reilly (disambiguation)